Ventus may refer to:

 Ventus (god) one of the Venti, Roman wind deities
 Ventus (Kingdom Hearts), video game character in the Kingdom Hearts series
 Ventus (novel), a science fiction novel by Karl Schroeder 
 Ventus (airplane), marque of Schempp-Hirth sailplanes, for Ventus or Ventus-2 gliders
 Ventus (wireless company)
 Ventus (gaming company)
 Ventus, 8th on list of tallest buildings in İzmir